The 2020 Florida Cup was the sixth edition of Florida Cup, a friendly association football tournament played in the United States. It was contested from January 15 to 18, and was won by Palmeiras in their first participation. The competition was partnered with Universal Orlando Resort and Adidas.

Teams

Standings

Matches

References

External links

2020
2020 in American soccer
January 2020 sports events in the United States
2020 in sports in Florida